Sian Elizabeth Ansley Ruck is a New Zealand former cricketer who played as a left-arm medium bowler. She appeared in 27 One Day Internationals and 37 Twenty20 Internationals for New Zealand between 2009 and 2013. She played domestic cricket for Wellington and Northern Districts, as well as stints with Australian Capital Territory, Essex, Hertfordshire and Worcestershire.

References

External links

1983 births
Living people
Cricketers from Auckland
New Zealand women cricketers
New Zealand cricketers
New Zealand women One Day International cricketers
New Zealand women Twenty20 International cricketers
Northern Districts women cricketers
Wellington Blaze cricketers
Worcestershire women cricketers
Essex women cricketers
Hertfordshire women cricketers
ACT Meteors cricketers